Burgsee is a lake in Schleswig, Schleswig-Holstein, Germany. Its surface area is 31.83 ha.

Lakes of Schleswig-Holstein
Schleswig, Schleswig-Holstein